{{DISPLAYTITLE:C26H40O2}}
The molecular formula C26H40O2 (molar mass: 384.59 g/mol, exact mass: 384.3028 u) may refer to:

 L-759,656
 L-759,633